Interstate 75 (I-75) is a part of the Interstate Highway System that runs north–south from Miami, Florida, to Sault Ste. Marie in the Upper Peninsula of the US state of Michigan. I-75 enters the state from Ohio in the south, north of Toledo, and runs generally northward through Detroit, Pontiac and Bay City, crosses the Mackinac Bridge, and ends at the Canadian border in Sault Ste. Marie. The landscapes traversed by I-75 include Southern Michigan farmland, northern forests, suburban bedroom communities, and the urban core of Detroit. The freeway also uses three of the state's monumental bridges to cross major bodies of water. There are four auxiliary Interstates in the state related to I-75, as well as nine current or former business routes, with either Business Loop I-75 (BL I-75) or Business Spur I-75 (BS I-75) designations.

The freeway bears several names in addition to the I-75 designation. The southern segment was called the Detroit–Toledo Expressway during planning in the 1950s and 1960s. Through Detroit, I-75 is the Fisher Freeway or the Walter P. Chrysler Freeway, named for pioneers in the auto industry. Sections on either side of the Mackinac Bridge are the G. Mennen Williams Freeway or the Prentiss M. Brown Freeway, named for politicians who helped get the bridge built. Officially, the entire length is the American Legion Memorial Highway, after the organization of the same name. Various sections carry components of the four Great Lakes Circle Tours in the state.

Several Indian trails spanned the state along the general path of the modern freeway. After statehood, several of these were converted into plank roads that later became some of the first state highways. In the 1920s, five of these were added to the United States Numbered Highway System: US Highway 2 (US 2), US 10, US 24, US 25, and US 27. In the 1950s, a Michigan Turnpike was proposed as a tolled, controlled-access highway in the Lower Peninsula. After passage of the Federal Highway Act of 1956, this turnpike proposal was shelved as a free Interstate Highway was planned. Construction started in 1957, signs went up in 1959, and I-75 was completed in 1973. Since completion, the freeway has been upgraded with the construction of the Zilwaukee Bridge near Saginaw and improved connections to the Ambassador Bridge in Detroit.

Route description
Known as "Michigan's Main Street", I-75 is listed on the National Highway System (NHS) for its entire length; the NHS is a network of roadways important to the country's economy, defense, and mobility. The freeway is the busiest in the state: between M-8 (Davison Highway) and McNichols Road in Detroit approximately 194,300 vehicles used the freeway on average each day in 2010; in contrast the lowest traffic level was 3,208 vehicles between the M-48 and M-80 interchanges in Chippewa County. I-75 carries segments of all four Great Lakes Circle Tours in the state. It is also the only highway located on both Michigan's Upper and Lower peninsulas (UP and LP, respectively). Between the Ohio state line and Kawkawlin, I-75 contains between a minimum of six and a maximum of ten lanes total; other sections vary between four and six lanes in total.

Lake Erie shore and the Downriver communities

Crossing the state line north of Toledo, Ohio, I-75 enters Michigan in Monroe County carrying the Lake Erie Circle Tour (LECT) near the North Maumee Bay of Lake Erie. The freeway runs parallel to the shoreline of the Great Lake and past the community of Luna Pier. Further north, I-75 passes to the southeast of Monroe and crosses the River Raisin between the city and the river mouth. North of the river, the freeway turns further inland running through farmland. Near Newport, I-275 splits off to the northwest and I-75 continues its northeastward trek through Monroe County. When it crosses the Huron River, the trunkline enters Wayne County between South Rockwood and Rockwood.

On the north side of the county line, I-75 begins to run inland of, and parallel to, the Detroit River, entering the Downriver area. The freeway turns northerly after the interchange with M-85 (Fort Street) near Gibraltar, and the LECT departs I-75 to follow M-85 north of the interchange. The landscape transitions to suburban residential areas instead of farmland through this area. The freeway turns back northeasterly in Taylor and intersects the southern end of M-39 (Southfield Highway) in Lincoln Park. I-75 crosses the Ecorse River and passes through an industrial area of Metro Detroit. Farther north, the freeway spans the River Rouge in the southern part of Detroit.

I-75 parallels M-85 (Fort Street) and follows the Detroit River as far east as the Ambassador Bridge. Near the bridge's approaches, the freeway turns 90° away from the river and intersects the eastern end of I-96 before turning again to follow the river further inland. From there, I-75 meets M-10 (Lodge Freeway) and M-5 (Grand River Avenue). East of Grand River, I-75 travels past Little Caesars Arena, home of the Detroit Red Wings and Detroit Pistons, and passes under M-1 (Woodward Avenue). East of Woodward, the freeway travels past both Comerica Park and Ford Field, homes of the Detroit Tigers and Detroit Lions professional sports teams, respectively.

Detroit to the Tri-Cities

Immediately east of Ford Field, I-75 turns northwesterly to follow the Chrysler Freeway away from the downtown Detroit area. The transition from the Fisher Freeway involves a set of one-lane ramps through the interchange with the connections to I-375 and M-3 (Gratiot Avenue). Heading north-northwesterly, I-75 passes to the east of the campus of Wayne State University and through an interchange with I-94 (Edsel Ford Freeway). The Chrysler Freeway passes to the west of Hamtramck and to the east of Highland Park, enclaves within Detroit. I-75 meets M-8 (Davison Freeway) and continues through residential areas of Detroit's northern side. North of M-102 (8 Mile Road), the freeway crosses out of Detroit and into Oakland County. The Chrysler Freeway jogs through the suburb of Hazel Park, site of the "worst freeway for accidents in Metro Detroit" at a curve near 9 Mile Road.

Further north, I-75 intersects I-696 near 10 Mile Road. The freeway continues northward for about  into Troy, where it turns westward. The route for I-75 zig-zags through Troy and Auburn Hills as the freeway alternates from north–south to east–west to bypass Pontiac. Near the M-59 interchange, I-75 passes the headquarters for Chrysler. Farther north, by the M-24 interchange, it runs near the former site of The Palace of Auburn Hills. The freeway traverses through additional suburban residential areas as it runs northwesterly away from Pontiac. These subdivisions end north of Clarkston, which is the location of the northern terminus for US 24. Continuing through Holly and Newark, the freeway transitions back to a rural, wooded setting and enters Genesee County.

As I-75 approaches Grand Blanc, the landscape changes back to suburbs. I-475 (UAW Freeway) splits off to the north to bypass the east side of Flint, and then I-75 merges with US 23. The combined I-75/US 23 turns northerly to round the west side of the city. I-75/US 23 meets I-69 near the Bishop International Airport southwest of downtown Flint. The freeway continues northward along the western residential neighborhoods, encountering the northern end of I-475 near Mount Morris. I-75 passes to the west of Clio and the east of Birch Run, the latter home to a large outlet mall. From there, the trunkline travels through farmland in southern Saginaw County.

Central Michigan

I-75/US 23 enters the southern reaches of the suburban Tri-Cities at Bridgeport and proceeds northward through the area. The freeway passes to the east of downtown Saginaw. I-675 splits off to run westward into downtown, and I-75 curves around to the northwest to cross the Saginaw River on the Zilwaukee Bridge in the suburb of Zilwaukee. North of the river, I-675 reconnects to I-75, which continues northward into Bay County. The freeway passes to the west of Bay City, encountering the eastern end of the US 10 freeway. From there, I-75/US 23 curves northwesterly to bypass Kawkawlin before continuing north to the Standish area through farmlands inland from the Saginaw Bay. West of Standish, US 23 splits to follow the Lake Huron shoreline, and I-75 turns northwesterly to run inland.

West of Sterling, the landscape changes again; in this area the freeway enters forest lands. I-75 continues northwestward through Arenac County and crosses into western Ogemaw County. M-30 passes under the freeway without an interchange as I-75 rounds the west side of West Branch. On the northwest side of that city, M-55 merges onto I-75, and the two highways turn to run concurrently westward into Roscommon County. East of Prudenville, M-55 splits from the freeway. I-75 turns northward to curve around the east of Houghton and Higgins lakes. Turning back to the northwest, the trunkline bypasses Roscommon to the south and transfers into southern Crawford County.

Northern Michigan

After the US 127 interchange, I-75 turns northward, and passes to the east of Grayling. There are a pair of interchanges on either end of town for BL I-75, and the southern one is a partial interchange; only northbound I-75 traffic may access the business loop and traffic entering the freeway may only access southbound I-75. There is no interchange further north for M-72; access to that highway is provided through the business loop. On the north side of Grayling, there is a full interchange for BL I-75/M-93 that provides the southbound I-75 connection to M-72 as well as access from both directions to Hartwick Pines State Park.

Crossing into southern Otsego County, I-75 continues northward through Northern Michigan forests. It passes to the east of the community of Waters and Otsego Lake. North of exit 279, I-75 proceeds by the Gaylord Regional Airport and crosses the 45th Parallel, the halfway mark between the Equator and the North Pole by latitude. The freeway then traverses the west side of Gaylord and continues through forests in the northern sections of the county. North of Vanderbilt, I-75 enters southern Cheboygan County, assuming the G. Mennen Williams Freeway name.

I-75 continues northward through Cheboygan County, passing the community of Indian River and spanning the river of the same name. North of town, the freeway traverses the area between Burt and Mullett lakes before intersecting the southern end of M-27; that highway provides access to Topinabee and Cheboygan. I-75 continues northward through tree farms and other agricultural properties in rural Cheboygan County. Cheboygan is accessible by way of interchanges for C-64 and C-66, a pair of county-designated highways in this area. North of C-66, I-75 turns northwesterly. The freeway meets the northern end of US 31 and picks up the Lake Michigan Circle Tour (LMCT) designation before entering Emmet County on the south side of Mackinaw City. I-75 then parallels the county line on the west side of the village, meeting the northern end of US 23. After that interchange, the Lake Huron Circle Tour (LHCT) merges in from the south. There is one more interchange along the freeway before I-75 ascends the approaches to the Mackinac Bridge.

Mackinac Bridge

The Mackinac Bridge carries I-75 across the Straits of Mackinac that separate Michigan's Upper and Lower peninsulas; the straits also form the connection between Lakes Michigan and Huron. The structure, unlike the rest of the state highways in Michigan like I-75, is under the maintenance and control of the Mackinac Bridge Authority (MBA). In addition to cash, the MBA offers a pre-paid debit card option for the payment of tolls and accepts credit cards at the toll booths. The authority also provides a driver assistance program that will drive vehicles across the bridge at no additional charge; motorists who use the service have a fear of bridges. Because the bridge normally only allows motor vehicles, bicyclists and snowmobiles shuttled across are subject to fees. The authority maintains a small police department to patrol the bridge and escort vehicles across, and a pair of radio station transmitters that broadcast bridge conditions and travel information on AM 530 and AM 1610.

Upper Peninsula

North of the Mackinac Bridge, I-75 passes to the west of downtown St. Ignace, traveling between the Father Marquette National Memorial and Straits State Park. There is an interchange north of the toll plaza that marks the eastern end of US 2 in the state and the southern end of BL I-75. The LMCT departs I-75 to follow US 2 while the LHCT follows BL I-75 through town. The freeway curves around Chain Lake and the Mackinac County Airport and meets the northern end of the business loop near Castle Rock; the LHCT returns to I-75 at that interchange as well. Continuing northward, M-123 (Tahquamenon Trail) intersects from the west as the freeway parallels H-63 (Mackinac Trail), the former route of US 2. I-75 crosses the Carp River and follows the shores of St. Martin Bay before meeting M-134. At that interchange, the LHCT departs again to run eastward. Through this area, the freeway continues northeasterly, traversing the Eastern Unit of the Hiawatha National Forest.

I-75 crosses the Pine River before entering Chippewa County. The freeway takes a more northerly track as it travels under M-48 without an interchange. Farther north, M-48 curves around to connect I-75 with Rudyard, and the freeway turns back to continue northeastward. North of there in Dafter, the freeway intersects M-28 (9 Mile Road). Beyond that interchange, I-75 picks up the Lake Superior Circle Tour (LSCT) designation, which it carries the rest of the way north. On the south side of Sault Ste. Marie, the freeway meets BS I-75 and picks up the LHCT designation one more time. I-75 rounds the west side of the city, passes the Sault Ste. Marie Municipal Airport and the campus of Lake Superior State University before meeting the customs and toll plazas for the International Bridge. From there, I-75 crosses the two-lane bridge and terminates at the Canadian border. , the toll rates on the bridge are $3 for passenger vehicles, $2.10 for commuters, and $4 per axle for commercial vehicles; currently the same toll rate is assessed in US dollars and Canadian dollars. Motorists have the option to pay with cash or an IQ Card, an electronic toll collection debit card that uses radio-frequency identification technology.

History

Indian trails to state highways

Before Michigan became a state, the first land transportation corridors were the Indian trails. The French-Indian Trail ran through southeastern Michigan between Toledo, Monroe and Detroit. The Saginaw Trail ran north from Detroit to the Saginaw area where it connected with the original Mackinaw Trail that ran roughly parallel to, and west of, the modern I-75. Another path, the Cheboygan Trail, ran parallel to the modern freeway to the east between the West Branch area and Cheboygan. In the UP, an extension of the Mackinac Trail connected St. Ignace and Sault Ste. Marie. In the 19th century, the Michigan Legislature chartered private companies to build and operate plank roads or turnpikes in the state, many of which replaced the original Indian trails. These roads were originally made of oak planks, but later legislation permitted gravel as well. By the first decade of the 20th century, only 23 of the 202 chartered turnpikes were still in operation; many companies that received a charter never built their specified roadways. The remaining plank roads were turned over to the state or purchased by railway companies in the early part of the century.

The State Trunkline Highway System was formed on May 13, 1913, and several sections of the system were designated along the course of the then-future I-75. Division 1 connected the Ohio state line northeasterly to Detroit, and Division 2 connected Detroit with Mackinaw City. A branch of Division 7 ran north from St. Ignace to Sault Ste. Marie. The system was signposted in 1919, and those highways were marked on maps for the first time. The first M-10 was designated along the highways from Ohio through Detroit to Standish. M-76 connected Standish with Grayling, where the first M-14 ran northward to Cheboygan. From there, M-10 connected to Mackinaw City. In the UP, M-12 connected St. Ignace with Sault Ste. Marie along a route to the east of the old Mackinac Trail. When the United States Numbered Highway System was formed on November 11, 1926, most of these highways were redesignated as part of the national system. From the state line northward, M-10 was included as a part of US 24 and US 25. At Detroit, M-10 was used as a part of US 10. North of Grayling, M-14 was redesignated as a part of US 27. M-12 was used for US 2.

The Michigan State Highway Department (MSHD) rerouted US 2 in 1933 between Rogers Park and Sault Ste. Marie. The new routing followed Mackinac Trail instead of turning east to Cedarville and north to Sault Ste. Marie; the former routing was given the M-121 designation.

Turnpikes and freeways
By 1945, a divided highway designated Alternate US 24 (US 24A) was opened from the state line north to Erie. After World War II, the MSHD planned to convert several highways in the state to freeways. In planning maps from 1947, the modern I-75 corridor was included in the system that later became the Interstate Highway System. It was also included in the General Location of National System of Interstate Highways Including All Additional Routes at Urban Areas Designated in September 1955 that was released in 1955 as the federal government readied plans for the freeway system.

The Michigan Turnpike Authority (MTA), an agency which was created in 1951, proposed the construction of a toll freeway to run north–south in the state. The original termini for the turnpike were Bridgeport and Rockwood. The state highway commissioner at the time, Charles Ziegler, distrusted a separate agency dealing with statewide road building at the time, and he worked to stall progress on any proposed turnpikes. Ziegler, who had a seat on the MTA board, publicly sparred with authority chairman George Higgins, even announcing that the MSHD would build a parallel freeway that would "reduce tolls on the turnpike 40 to 50 percent" according to consultants. Trucking interests in the state also opposed the projects, preferring a moderate gas tax increase over any tolls. Detroit denied the MTA permission to route a turnpike through the city over issues related to the River Rouge, Rouge Park and access across the right-of-way. After a lawsuit by City of Dearborn, the legislation creating the authority was upheld by the Michigan Supreme Court in 1955, and the authority was allowed to sell bonds for its Bridgeport–Rockwood and Detroit–Chicago toll roads.

The original planning maps plotted the first turnpike to the west of Detroit, running near US 24 (Telegraph Road). This route was later proposed for I-75 itself; I-275 would have been the freeway to loop into downtown Detroit. The proposed length was increased by December 1955; the extended Michigan Turnpike would have run from a connection across the Ohio state line to Toledo north through Detroit and Saginaw and eventually to the southern end of the Mackinac Bridge. By the following April, any extensions were cancelled leaving the turnpike to its original termini; the east–west companion road was also cancelled at that time. The MTA proposed a state constitutional amendment in January 1956 that would allow the Michigan Legislature to issue state-guaranteed bonds for part of the MTA's construction expenses. According to The Wall Street Journal, the authority "struggled for survival" in the face of opposition from the MSHD just two months later; the department's actions impaired the authority's appropriations from the state legislature and its ability to sell the necessary bonds to pay for construction. When the federal government approved the Federal Aid Highway Act of 1956, Ziegler and the MSHD announced plans for a full freeway to run north through the Lower Peninsula and continue across to the Upper Peninsula. This announcement undermined the efforts to build the Michigan Turnpike. By August 1956, the MTA voted to reduce its operations to a skeleton staff, but moved forward in May 1957 on a bond sale to finance construction of the roadway. Financiers stated such a sale was only feasible if the turnpike was to be safe from competition. The Michigan Townships Association called for the abolition of the MTA in 1958. The legislature killed a bill to do so in June 1959, but it later voted to repeal the act that created the authority in 1962.

Interstate Highway era
The first sections of freeway for I-75 were opened in 1957, beginning with the southern section near the Ohio state line opened in October 1957. The Mackinac Bridge was opened to traffic on November 1, 1957; a new section of freeway and an interchange connected US 2 to the bridge on the northern end, and to US 27 and US 31 on the southern end. The MSHD formally proposed the I-75 number in 1958. On June 30 of that year, the first stretch of the "Fenton–Clio Expressway" opened. Construction on the Chrysler Freeway in Detroit started on January 30, 1959. The I-75 signs were first installed along the Detroit–Toledo Expressway in October 1959, replacing US 24A signage in the Monroe area, after the state waited for final approval of the numbering system to be used in the state.

In November 1960, sections of freeway opened from Indian River north to the southern Mackinac Bridge approaches in Mackinaw City and from St. Ignace to Evergreen Shores, and by December, the section of freeway running between Evergreen Shores and M-123 was scheduled to open.

In 1961, the MSHD had proposed that the section of I-75 south of Detroit to Toledo be built as an electronic highway under a bid through General Motors; the testing for such a roadway was ultimately done at Ohio State University instead. That same year the original Zilwaukee Bridge, a bascule bridge across the Saginaw River was opened, along with a section of freeway north to Kawkawlin. In October 1961, the first segment of I-75 near Grayling opened, connecting M-18 with the city. By the end of the year, the freeway was completed between Kinross and Dafter in the UP, and the former segment of US 27 between Grayling and Gaylord was turned back to local control.

The  section of I-75 was opened between Gaylord and Waters in July 1962. Another temporary To I-75 designation was applied along US 10 and US 27 from Bay City to Grayling. In August, the section between Gaylord and Vanderbilt was completed. On October 25, the section of freeway from M-24 near Pontiac to the Flint area opened. Also late in the year, the freeway gap was filled in between Vanderbilt and Indian River. The International Bridge and its approaches opened in Sault Ste. Marie on October 31, 1962.

The following year, a set of segments opened in the Detroit area. The freeway was extended south from Pontiac to 11 Mile Road with a connection along M-150 to M-102 (8 Mile Road). Another section opened to connect with US 24 (Telegraph Road) in the Woodhaven area; a To I-75 designation was added to connect along US 24 and M-102 to M-150. On the other end of the state, the gaps in the freeway across the UP were completed in 1963 as well, and the section of freeway in Northern Michigan was named the most scenic new highway in the US in 1963 by Parade magazine.

The first part of the Chrysler Freeway opened to traffic on June 26, 1964, the southern mile (1.6 km) of which was designated I-375. The segment of I-75 through the Downriver suburbs of Detroit between the US 24 (Telegraph Road) connector and M-39 (Southfield Highway) was completed on December 28, 1966. The same year, I-75 was scheduled to open southward from 11 Mile Road to M-102 (8 Mile Road). In 1967, two segments of freeway opened. One was from Kawkawlin to Standish in October, and the other through Detroit extended I-75 along the Fisher Freeway in December. The first section of M-76 freeway from Standish northwesterly to Alger was scheduled to open in July 1968. A  section of the Chrysler Freeway through Detroit opened on December 19, 1968, and the remainder was scheduled to open on January 10, 1969.

In 1970, I-75 through Detroit was completed, and two additional sections of M-76 were converted to freeway. The northern section ran from the US 27-to-I-75 transition south of Grayling to the Crawford–Roscommon county line, and the second was an extension from Alger to the West Branch area. The first ice-detection system in the state was installed on the River Rouge bridges in the Detroit area in an attempt to maximize driver safety. The next year, the last section of the Chrysler Freeway in Hazel Park was finished when an interchange for the then-unbuilt I-696 was completed. Another segment of the M-76 freeway was completed at the same time, bypassing Roscommon. The final section between Alger and Roscommon was opened on November 1, 1973, in a dedication by Governor William G. Milliken.

Since the freeway was completed in 1973, a few changes have been made to I-75 in Michigan. From 1973 to 1975, I-75 was widened from four to six lanes from south of Flint to north of Bay City. MDOT truncated US 2 to end in St. Ignace by removing it from the I-75 freeway in 1983. In 1986, US 10 was truncated to Bay City, removing its concurrency with I-75 from there to Clarkston. Two years later, the original bascule Zilwaukee Bridge across the Saginaw River was replaced by a much higher structure slightly north of the former bridge. All of I-75 within Michigan was named the Tuskegee Airmen Memorial Highway, in honor of the Tuskegee Airmen, at the end of December 2014. In May 2017, MDOT raised the speed limit on I-75 between Bay City and Sault Ste.

Gateway Project

Beginning on February 25, 2008, I-75 closed completely to traffic in both directions from Rosa Parks Boulevard (exit 49) to Clark Street (exit 47) in Detroit. This facilitated the complete rebuilding of the road as part of the Ambassador Gateway Project to better connect I-75 and I-96 to the Ambassador Bridge. Through traffic on I-75 was rerouted along I-94 to I-275 and local detours were posted. The freeway reopened to traffic in June 2009, five months ahead of schedule. The overall project to realign and connect the bridge to the freeways was mired in lawsuits between MDOT and the private company that owns the bridge. The company's owner was jailed for contempt of court during court proceedings in early 2012. MDOT was later ordered to assume responsibility for construction, and the department completed the project on September 21, 2012.

Freeway names

I-75 has six named segments in Michigan. The southernmost section from the state line north to the Detroit area is the Detroit–Toledo Expressway. The segment through southern and central Detroit is known as the Fisher Freeway. It was dedicated on September 17, 1970, to the Fisher Brothers, who founded Fisher Body, later a part of General Motors. After the curve in downtown Detroit, I-75 follows the Walter P. Chrysler Freeway northward. That segment is named for Walter P. Chrysler, founder of Chrysler. The name was chosen by the Detroit Common Council on November 6, 1957, and codified in state law in 1990; the state definition for the name places the northern end of the designation at the Oakland–Genesee county line.

Officially, the entire length of I-75 in Michigan is the American Legion Memorial Highway. As a practical matter, this name is not used on the southernmost segments of the Interstate. The American Legion was honored with the designation in 1969 in a state law that required private interests to finance the signage. Public Act 174 of 1984 redesignated I-75 in honor of the group and placed responsibility for signage in MDOT's hands. Another name that was applied to all of I-75 was the Michigan Bicentennial Freedom Way. Designated by Senate Concurrent Resolution 216 of 1975, the name only applied to the freeway in 1976. The designation was formally repealed in 2001.

Two other segments near the Straits of Mackinac were named in 1976 for figures instrumental in the construction of the Mackinac Bridge. From the Cheboygan–Otsego county line north to the bridge, I-75 was named for G. Mennen Williams, the former governor once called "Michigan's Politician of the Century" in the press. The section in Mackinac County from the northern end of the Mackinac Bridge was named for Prentiss M. Brown, the former Congressman and Senator who served on the MBA board until his death in 1971.

Monumental bridges

Along its route in the state, I-75 utilizes three of Michigan's monumental bridges. The first of them is the Zilwaukee Bridge near Saginaw. The original bridge across the Saginaw River at Zilwaukee was built in 1960 as a bascule bridge to allow shipping traffic to use the river. Opening the drawbridge would back traffic up on I-75/US 10/US 23 for upwards of four hours on holiday weekends. Approved in 1974, construction on the replacement bridge started in October 1979. A major construction accident in August 1982 delayed completion of the new Zilwaukee Bridge; a bridge pier partially collapsed when contractors overloaded a section under construction. The affected  deck segment tilted to rest  higher on one end and  lower on the other. The structure was originally supposed to cost $76.8 million with a 1983 completion date; in the end it cost $131.3 million (equivalent to $ in ) when the southbound span finally opened on September 19, 1988. The structure is the largest concrete segmental bridge in the United States.

The second is the Mackinac Bridge that connects Michigan's two peninsulas at the Straits of Mackinac. A structure was first proposed in 1888 by one of the directors of the Grand Hotel on Mackinac Island. Car ferry service was started in 1923 to cross the straits, and a bridge authority was first created in 1934 to investigate the possibility of building a permanent connection across the straits. This early authority started with a 1921 proposal for a series of bridges that would have connected Cheboygan to St. Ignace by way of Bois Blanc, Round, and Mackinac islands. The federal Public Works Administration rejected loan and grant requests for that project. A second, direct crossing was then proposed based on designs used for the Tacoma Narrows Bridge. The collapse of that bridge and World War II delayed any further work on a structure beyond tests of the lake bottom and the construction of the  causeway on the St. Ignace side; the first bridge authority was abolished in 1947. The current agency was created on June 6, 1950.

The MBA was authorized in 1952 to sell bonds to finance construction, which were sold on December 17, 1953, to finance the $99.8 million (equivalent to $ in ) cost of the bridge. The structure was designed by David B. Steinman and built by Merritt-Chapman & Scott for the substructure and the American Bridge Company division of U.S. Steel Corporation for the superstructure. Construction started in 1954 and the Mackinac Bridge opened to traffic on November 1, 1957. Final work on the bridge was completed in September 1958. Overall, the structure has a  central suspension span flanked by two  side spans. In 2000, the bridge was named "Michigan's No. 1 Civil Engineering Project of the 20th Century" by the Michigan Section of the American Society of Civil Engineers (ASCE), and the structure was named a National Historic Civil Engineering Landmark in 2010 by the national ASCE.

The northernmost of the three monumental bridges along I-75 is the International Bridge, linking the twin cities of Sault Ste. Marie in Michigan and Ontario. The governments on each side of the international border formed a bridge authority to build a highway bridge in 1935. Construction started on the structure September 16, 1960. The bridge was designed by the same firm that handled the Mackinac Bridge for a cost of $20 million (equivalent to $ in ). It opened to traffic on October 31, 1962.

Exit list

Related trunklines

There are four auxiliary Interstate Highways for I-75 in Michigan. I-275 begins as a loop from northern Monroe County and continues to connect with I-96 and I-696. The freeway serves the population of western Wayne County and Detroit Metropolitan Wayne County Airport. The highway was originally intended to connect with I-75 north of Pontiac. I-375 was the shortest signed Interstate in the nation; it serves the immediate downtown Detroit area. I-475 is known as the UAW Freeway and the David Dunbar Buick Freeway. This freeway serves Flint's downtown areas as I-75 goes to the west side of the city. The fourth auxiliary Interstate is I-675, a loop into the city of Saginaw that served as an alternate to I-75 when the drawbridge over the Saginaw River was still operating.

In addition to the auxiliary Interstates, there are eight current business routes related to the freeway in the state. These business loops and spurs provide signed connections into the downtowns of Pontiac, Bay City, West Branch, Roscommon, Grayling, Gaylord, St. Ignace, and Sault Ste. Marie. A ninth highway was previously designated in Saginaw as well. A 10th business route has been proposed for Indian River.

See also

Notes

References

External links

 
 
 I-75 at Michigan Highways
 I-75 in Michigan at AARoads

 Michigan
75
Lake Erie Circle Tour
Lake Huron Circle Tour
Lake Michigan Circle Tour
Lake Superior Circle Tour
Transportation in Monroe County, Michigan
Transportation in Wayne County, Michigan
Transportation in Oakland County, Michigan
Transportation in Genesee County, Michigan
Transportation in Saginaw County, Michigan
Transportation in Bay County, Michigan
Transportation in Arenac County, Michigan
Transportation in Ogemaw County, Michigan
Transportation in Roscommon County, Michigan
Transportation in Crawford County, Michigan
Transportation in Otsego County, Michigan
Transportation in Cheboygan County, Michigan
Transportation in Emmet County, Michigan
Transportation in Mackinac County, Michigan
Transportation in Chippewa County, Michigan